The 2020 Minnesota Golden Gophers football team represented the University of Minnesota in the 2020 NCAA Division I FBS football season. The Golden Gophers played their home games at TCF Bank Stadium in Minneapolis, Minnesota, and competed in the West Division of the Big Ten Conference. They were led by fourth-year head coach P. J. Fleck.

On August 11, 2020, the Big Ten Conference canceled all fall sports competitions due to the COVID-19 pandemic. However, on September 16, the Big Ten reinstated the season, announcing an eight-game season beginning on October 24.

Previous season
The Golden Gophers finished the 2019 season with finished with their highest win total ever, at  11–2, 7–2 in Big Ten play to finish tied for first place in the West Division.  They were invited to the Outback Bowl, where they defeated Auburn and finished #10 in the AP poll.

Schedule 
Minnesota had games scheduled against Florida Atlantic, Tennessee Tech, and BYU, but canceled these games on July 9 due to the Big Ten Conference's decision to play a conference-only schedule due to the COVID-19 pandemic.

Source:

Rankings

Players drafted into the NFL

References

Minnesota
Minnesota Golden Gophers football seasons
Minnesota Golden Gophers football